Sound-on-disc is a class of sound film processes using a phonograph or other disc to record or play back sound in sync with a motion picture.  Early sound-on-disc systems used a mechanical interlock with the movie projector, while more recent systems use timecode.

Examples of sound-on-disc processes

France
 The Chronophone (Léon Gaumont) "Filmparlants" and phonoscènes 1902–1910 (experimental), 1910–1917 (industrial)

United States
 Vitaphone introduced by Warner Bros. in 1926
 Phono-Kinema, short-lived system, invented by Orlando Kellum in 1921 (used by D. W. Griffith for Dream Street)
 Digital Theater Systems

United Kingdom
 British Phototone, short-lived UK system using 12-inch discs, introduced in 1928-29 (Clue of the New Pin)

Other
 Systems with the film projector linked to a phonograph or cylinder phonograph, developed by Thomas Edison (Kinetophone, Kinetophonograph), Selig Polyscope, French companies such as Gaumont (Chronomégaphone and Chronophone) and Pathé, and British systems.

References

See also
Sound film (includes history of sound film)
Sound-on-film
List of film formats

Film sound production
History of film
Film and video technology
Motion picture film formats